Robert Page Waller Morris (June 30, 1853 – December 16, 1924) was a United States representative from Minnesota and a United States district judge of the United States District Court for the District of Minnesota.

Education and career

Born on June 30, 1853, in Lynchburg, Campbell County, Virginia, Morris attended a private school. He attended the College of William & Mary, graduated from Virginia Military Institute in 1872, then read law in 1880. He was an Assistant Professor of Mathematics for Virginia Military Institute from 1872 to 1873. He was a Professor of Mathematics for Texas Military Institute (now TMI Episcopal) from 1873 to 1876. He was a Professor of Applied Mathematics for Texas Agricultural and Mechanical College (now Texas A&M University) from 1876 to 1879. He was admitted to the bar and entered private practice in Lynchburg from 1880 to 1886. He was a candidate for the United States House of Representatives of the 49th United States Congress from Virginia in 1884. He continued private practice in Duluth, Minnesota starting in 1886. He was a Judge of the Duluth Municipal Court starting in 1889. He was city attorney of Duluth starting in 1894. He was a Judge of the Minnesota District Court for the Eleventh Judicial District from 1895 to 1896.

Congressional service

Morris was elected as a Republican from Minnesota's 6th congressional district to the United States House of Representatives of the 55th, 56th, and 57th United States Congresses, serving from March 4, 1897 to March 3, 1903. He declined to be a candidate for renomination.

Federal judicial service

Morris was nominated by President Theodore Roosevelt on March 5, 1903, to the United States District Court for the District of Minnesota, to a new seat authorized by 32 Stat. 795. He was confirmed by the United States Senate on March 9, 1903, and received his commission the same day. He assumed inactive senior status on June 30, 1923, meaning that while he remained a federal judge, he did not hear any cases or conduct any business for the court. He moved to Pasadena, California, after taking senior status. His service terminated on December 16, 1924, due to his death in Rochester, Olmsted County, Minnesota. He was interred in Forest Hill Cemetery in Duluth.

References

Sources
 
 

1853 births
1924 deaths
People from Duluth, Minnesota
People from Lynchburg, Virginia
Minnesota state court judges
Virginia lawyers
Judges of the United States District Court for the District of Minnesota
United States district court judges appointed by Theodore Roosevelt
20th-century American judges
College of William & Mary alumni
Virginia Military Institute alumni
Texas A&M University faculty
Republican Party members of the United States House of Representatives from Minnesota